This is a list of seasons completed by the Penn Quakers football team of the National Collegiate Athletic Association (NCAA) Division I Football Championship Subdivision (FCS). Since the team's first season in 1876, the Quakers have competed in nearly than 1,500 officially sanctioned games, holding an all-time record of 861–496–42. Penn joined the Ivy League as a founding member in 1956.

Seasons

* As the result of an eligibility scandal, Penn offered to forfeit several wins in 1997, leading to a 1–9 overall record that year.

See also 
 List of Ivy League football standings

References

Penn

Penn Quakers football seasons